Jagatdal Assembly constituency is an assembly constituency in North 24 Parganas district in the Indian state of West Bengal.

Overview
As per orders of the Delimitation Commission, No. 106 Jagatdal Assembly constituency is composed of the following: Ward Nos. 18 to 35 of Bhatpara Municipality, and Kogachi I, Kogachi II, Mamudpur, Panpur Keutia gram panchayats of Barrackpore I community development block.

Jagatdal Assembly constituency is part of No. 15 Barrackpore (Lok Sabha constituency).

Members of Legislative Assembly

Election results

2021

2011
In the 2011 election, Parash Dutta of Trinamool Congress defeated his nearest rival Haripada Biswas of Forward Bloc.

 

Trinamool Congress did not contest this seat in 2006

1977-2006
In the 2006 and 2001 state assembly elections, Hari Pada Biswas of Forward Bloc won the Jagatdal assembly seat, defeating his nearest rivals Rahul (Biswajit) Sinha of BJP in 2006 and Mukul Roy of AITC in 2001. Contests in most years were multi-cornered but only winners and runners are mentioned. Anay Gopal Sinha of Congress defeated Nihar Basu of Forward Bloc in 1996. Nihar Basu of Forward Bloc defeated Anay Gopal Sinha of Congress in 1991, Nani Gopal Sarkar of Congress in 1987, Mrigen Lahiry of Congress in 1982 and Sudhin Bhattacharjee of Congress in 1977. Prior to that, the constituency did not exist.

References

Assembly constituencies of West Bengal
Politics of North 24 Parganas district